Nina Vladimirovna Timofeeva (11 June 1935 – 3 November 2014) was a Soviet ballet dancer.

Biography
Timofeeva was born in Leningrad and graduated from the Vaganova Academy of Russian Ballet in 1953. She made her theatrical debut as a student in 1951, as Masha in Tchaikovsky's The Nutcracker. From 1953 to 1956, she was a soloist with the Mariinsky Theatre in Saint Petersburg, and after that became a soloist with the Bolshoi Theater in Moscow. Her major roles included 
 Odette-Odile, in Tchaikovsky's Swan Lake (1956, 1970)
 Kitri, in Minkus’ Don Quixote (1959)
 The Mistress of the Copper Mountain, in Prokofiev's The Tale of the Stone Flower (1959)
 Aurora (1964) and Lilac Fairy (1977), in Tchaikovsky's The Sleeping Beauty (1964)
 Mekhmene-Banu, in Melikov's Legend of Love (1965)
 Leili, in Balasanian's Leili and Medzhnun (1965)
 Frigina, (1958) and Aegina (1968) in Khachaturian's Spartacus
 Lady Macbeth, in Molchanov's Macbeth (1980)

From 1966 to 1970, Timoveeva was a deputy to the Supreme Soviet.  She retired from stage performance in 1988, and from 1989 to 1991 worked as a choreographer for the Bolshoi Theater.  In 1991, she moved to Israel, together with her daughter Nadya, who is also a professional ballet dancer. Two years later, she published her memoirs, The World of Ballet.
  

Timofeeva was married twice.  Her first marriage was to Gennady Rozhdestvensky.  Her second marriage was to the composer Kirill Molchanov (1922–1982), who wrote music for some of her ballets.  Timofeeva and Molchanov remained married until his sudden death in 1982, before the start of one her performances of the ballet Macbeth.  Her daughter from her marriage to Molchanov survives her.

References

External links
 Нина Тимофеева на сайте Большого театра

1935 births
2014 deaths
Russian ballerinas
Mariinsky Ballet dancers
Soviet ballerinas